Patrick Reeves (1865 - 1 November 1896) was an Irish Gaelic footballer. His championship career with the Limerick senior team lasted three seasons from 1887 until 1889.

Reeves made his inter-county debut during the 1887 championship when the Commercials club represented Limerick in the inaugural championship. He won his sole All-Ireland medal that year as Limerick defeated Louth in the final.

Honours

Limerick
All-Ireland Senior Football Championship (1): 1887

References

1865 births
1896 deaths
Commercials (Limerick) Gaelic footballers
Limerick inter-county Gaelic footballers